The 27th National Television Awards were held on 13 October 2022 at the OVO Arena Wembley. It was hosted by Joel Dommett. The ceremony is typically held at the O2 Arena in Greenwich, but due to the damage the arena endured during Storm Eunice, it was confirmed that the awards would be held at Wembley. Originally scheduled to be held on 15 September 2022, they were since postponed to 13 October as a mark of respect following the death of Elizabeth II. The longlist nominations were released on 24 May 2022 and the shortlist was announced on 23 August 2022. Later that week, the ceremony announced that Robbie Williams would perform a medley of his discography, as well as a performance from Lewis Capaldi. In early October, Sam Ryder was announced to open the event instead of Williams.

Performances
 Sam Ryder – "Space Man" & "Somebody"
 Lewis Capaldi – "Forget Me"

Awards

Programmes with multiple nominations

Programmes with multiple wins

See also
 2022 in British television
 Storm Eunice

References

External links
 

National Television Awards
N
2022 in British television
N
National
National Television Awards